Tilawa is a recitation of the Quran, the Islamic Holy book.

Tilawa or Tilawah may also refer to:
 Sujud Tilawa, a Sujud during Quran recitation.
 Tilawah Al-Quran, an international Quran recital competition
 Majlis Tilawah Al-Quran competition, a Malaysian football competition